The Cherry Hotel is a historic hotel building located at Wilson, Wilson County, North Carolina. It was designed by Charles Collins Benton in Beaux Arts style and built in 1917.  It is a six-story, "U"-shaped brick building with approximately 200 rooms.  The interior features a two-story lobby with Art Deco style lighting fixtures.  The hotel closed in 1981. It was subsequently converted to apartments.

It was listed on the National Register of Historic Places in 1982. It is located in the Wilson Central Business-Tobacco Warehouse Historic District.

References

Hotel buildings on the National Register of Historic Places in North Carolina
Beaux-Arts architecture in North Carolina
Hotel buildings completed in 1917
Buildings and structures in Wilson County, North Carolina
National Register of Historic Places in Wilson County, North Carolina
Historic district contributing properties in North Carolina